XHUU-FM/XEUU-AM is an AM-FM combo Regional Mexican radio station in Colima, Colima, Mexico.

References

Regional Mexican radio stations
Radio stations in Colima
Mass media in Colima City